Ian Paul Richardson (born 9 May 1964) is an English footballer, who played as a forward in the Football League for Watford, Blackpool, Rotherham United, Chester City and Scunthorpe United.

References

Chester City F.C. players
Watford F.C. players
Scunthorpe United F.C. players
English Football League players
Association football forwards
Blackpool F.C. players
Rotherham United F.C. players
Staines Town F.C. players
1964 births
Living people
People from Ely, Cambridgeshire
English footballers